This article lists the presidents of the Parliament of Galicia, the regional legislature of Galicia.

Presidents

References

Galicia